Ilkka Tahvo "Ile" Kallio (born 18 November 1955) is a Finnish guitarist and singer. Kallio was born in Oulu, Finland. He was a founding member of the Hurriganes, then a member of the Finnish band The Dogs. During the 1990s performed as a duo with Kaija Kärkinen.

Discography

Albums
As part of Hurriganes
1975: Crazy Days
1976: Hot Wheels 
1977: Tsugu Way
1978: Hanger 
1983: Seven Days, Seven Nights
1984: Hurrygames
1996: Live in Stockholm 1977

As part of The Dogs
1979: Dogfood (credited as Pera & The Dogs)
1980: Radiator

Solo
1977: Irock 
1980: Get Out
1982: Rocks and Stones 
1986: Tänä yönä

as duo Kaija Kärkinen & Ile Kallio
1991: Mustaa vettä 
1995: Sade 
1996: Lupaus 
1997: Suuri salaisuus 
1999: Noitavoimaa 
2000: Kaikki oikeudet 
2002: Kymmenen laulua
2004: Kuka saa kyyneleet
2005: Sodassa ja rakkaudessa
2008: Saman taivaan alla 
2012: Köyhän naisen paratiisi

As Ile Kallio & Vierailevat Solistit
2007: Kirjeitä

As Ile Kallio Big Rock Band
2015: Shook Up!

References

1955 births
Living people
People from Oulu
Finnish male musicians